Electro-Soma is the debut studio album by British electronic music duo B12. It was released on Warp on 29 March 1993 and is the fourth release in Warp's Artificial Intelligence series. Some of the album's tracks had been previously released on the duo's own B12 Record label under their pseudonyms Musicology, Redcell, and Cmetric. Thus, Electro-Soma functions more as a compilation of some their earliest material than as a proper full-length LP, much like Incunabula by Autechre.

The vinyl release includes the exclusive track "Drift", but excludes the tracks "Debris", "Satori", and "Static Emotion", present on the CD release. A limited edition vinyl release also exists on orange vinyl. Although not noted on the case or booklet, the US compact disc distribution on Wax Trax! Records/TVT Records includes "Drift" as well as all 12 tracks originally included on the UK Warp compact disc.

Track listing

Personnel 
B12
 Mike Golding – mixing, production, recording, sequencing
 Steve Rutter – mixing, production, recording, sequencing

Additional personnel
 The Designers Republic Eclectroset – design
 Percival – artwork

References

External links 
 
 Electro-Soma at Warp

1993 albums
B12 (band) albums
Warp (record label) albums
Albums with cover art by The Designers Republic